The 2022 Ulster Senior Club Football Championship was the 54th instalment of the annual competition organised by Ulster GAA. It is one of the four provincial competitions of the 2022–23 All-Ireland Senior Club Football Championship.

Kilcoo from Down were the defending Ulster champions, having beaten Fermanagh's Derrygonnelly Harps in the 2021 final.

Derry champions Glen won their first Ulster title by beating Kilcoo in the final.

Teams
The Ulster championship is contested by the winners of the nine county championships in the Irish province of Ulster. Ulster comprises the six counties of Northern Ireland, as well as Cavan, Donegal and Monaghan in the Republic of Ireland.

Bracket

Preliminary round

Quarter-finals

Semi-finals

Final

Championship statistics

Top scorers
Overall

In a single game

References

Ulster Club SFC
Ulster Senior Club Championship
2022 in Northern Ireland sport
Ulster Senior Club Football Championship